Chimney Gulch is a valley and arroyo in the Diablo Range, in Santa Clara, California.

References 

Valleys of Santa Clara County, California
Rivers of Santa Clara County, California
Diablo Range